Patrick Carrigan (born 1 January 1998) is an Australian professional rugby league footballer who plays as a  and  for the Brisbane Broncos in the National Rugby League (NRL) and Australia at international level.

He has played at representative level for Queensland in State of Origin, winning the Wally Lewis Medal in 2022.

Background
Carrigan was born in Brisbane, Queensland, Australia. He attended St Joseph's College, Gregory Terrace in Brisbane and was the School Captain in 2015. He played Rugby Union and was Captain of the 1st XV  School Rugby Team. He was selected for Metropolitan North School Sports Rugby League in 2015.

Carrigan played his junior football for the Easts Tigers before being signed by the Brisbane Broncos.

A UQ Bachelor of Physiotherapy (Honours) student, he received a UQ Blue sporting honour in 2019, only the third Rugby League player to win this award since 1912.

Playing career

Early career
Carrigan played for the Brisbane Broncos in the Holden Cup from 2016 to 2017, winning the Broncos NYC U20s Player of The Year award both seasons, Broncos NYC U20s Best Forward in 2016 and Broncos NYC U20s Players' Player in 2017.

2019
In Round 5, 2019 Carrigan made his NRL debut for the Brisbane Broncos against the Wests Tigers. Carrigan would finish the season with 19 games played and would be awarded a joint winner of the Broncos Rookie of The Year award alongside fellow Broncos U20s graduate Thomas Flegler.

2020
With regular captain Alex Glenn missing the start of the 2020 NRL season due to injury, Carrigan would co-captain Brisbane for the first two rounds of the 2020 NRL season alongside recruit Brodie Croft having only previously played 19 NRL games in his career.

Carrigan made 19 appearances for Brisbane captaining in 12 of those games in the 2020 NRL season as the club finished last on the table and claimed the wooden spoon for the first time in their history.

Carrigan would win both the Broncos Player of The Year & Players' Player awards alongside Payne Haas, while being the sole recipient of the Broncos Most Consistent award.

Even with a poor season at club land Carrigan performed very well and was selected in the extended 27 man squad for Queensland in the State of Origin in November however did not play.

2021
In Round 9 of the 2021 NRL season, Carrigan suffered a season ending ACL injury during Brisbane's 19-18 loss against arch-rivals North Queensland.

2022
Returning from his ACL in Round 1, Carrigan would return finding career best form for a reborn Brisbane, helping return the club to the Top 4 mid-way through the competition, Carrigan would produce career best numbers to gain his maiden State of Origin jumper after just 8 games back. He became the first player in their debut series to win the Wally Lewis Medal.

Following Brisbane's shock loss against the Wests Tigers in round 20 of the 2022 NRL season, Carrigan was referred straight to the NRL judiciary after he performed a hip drop tackle on Wests Tigers Jackson Hastings which ended the players season. As a result of the tackle, Carrigan was suspended for four weeks.

In October he was named in the Australia squad for the 2021 Rugby League World Cup.
Carrigan played for Australia in their 2021 Rugby League World Cup final victory over Samoa.

Honours
Individual
 Brisbane Broncos U20s Player of The Year: 2016, 2017
 Brisbane Broncos U20s Players' Player: 2017
 Holden Cup Team of The Year: 2017
 Brisbane Broncos "Cyril Connell Award" Rookie of The Year: 2019
 Brisbane Broncos "Gary Balkin Award" Players' Player: 2020
 Brisbane Broncos "Kevin Walters Award" Most Consistent Player: 2020, 2022
 Brisbane Broncos "Paul Morgan Medal" Player of the Year: 2020
 Wally Lewis Medal: 2022
 Community Service Award: 2022

Representative
 2022 State of Origin series Winners

International
 2021 Rugby League World Cup Final

References

External links

Brisbane Broncos Profile

1998 births
Living people
Australia national rugby league team players
Australian rugby league players
Brisbane Broncos players
Queensland Rugby League State of Origin players
Rugby league locks
Rugby league players from Brisbane
Rugby league props
Wynnum Manly Seagulls players